Rangeela is an upcoming Indian Malayalam-language film Directed by Santhosh Nair. The film stars Sunny Leone in her debut lead role in Malayalam cinema, co-starring Salim Kumar, Johny Antony, Sujith Raj Kochukunju, Krrish Menon, Major Ravi, Jacob Gregory and Ramesh Pisharody in significant roles. It is produced by Jayalal Menon under his production banner Backwater Studios. Principal photography of the film commenced on 1 February 2019 in Goa.

Cast 

 Sunny Leone  
 Salim Kumar
 Aju Varghese
 Johny Antony
 Major Ravi
 Jacob Gregory
 Ramesh Pisharody
 Sujith Raj Kochukunju
 Sudheer Sukumaran
 Krrish Menon

Production 
The film marks Sunny Leone's debut film in Malayalam Film Industry and plays the main lead role in the film. The film kicked off shoot in Goa on 1 February 2019 with the portions and scenes shot relating to Sunny Leone.

References 

Upcoming films
Upcoming Malayalam-language films
2020s Malayalam-language films
Indian comedy films
Films shot in Goa